Austonley is a hamlet in the civil parish of Holme Valley, West Yorkshire, England, about  west of Holmfirth.

Villages in West Yorkshire